"I Wish It Could Be Christmas Everyday" is a Christmas song recorded by British glam rock band Wizzard. It was first released in December 1973 and, as with most Wizzard songs, was written and produced by the band's frontman Roy Wood—formerly of The Move and a founding member of Electric Light Orchestra. Despite the song's strong, long-lasting popularity, it has reached no higher than number four on the UK Singles Chart, a position it occupied for four consecutive weeks from December 1973 to January 1974. The song was beaten to the 1973 Christmas Number 1 spot by Slade's "Merry Xmas Everybody", which remained at the top of the charts for five weeks, from December 1973 to January 1974.

Wood sings lead vocals. The backing vocals for the single are by the Suedettes, augmented by the choir of Stockland Green School First Year. The original sleeve of the single credits "Miss Snob and Class 3C" with "Additional noises". The basic track for the single was recorded in August 1973, so to create a wintry feeling engineer Steve Brown decorated the studio with Christmas decorations and turned the air conditioning down to its coldest setting. Wood wore a woollen hat found in lost property. The schoolchildren were brought down from the Midlands to London by bus during the autumn half-term to add their contributions.

At the time of the single's release, Wizzard's contract with EMI was close to expiration. Promotional copies were pressed by Warner Bros., with whom the band had just signed for future releases. Only then was it discovered that EMI were legally entitled to the track after all, so the Warner Bros. Records pressings were halted and the record appeared on the Harvest label, but with the same picture sleeve. In a UK television special on ITV in December 2012, the British public voted the song second (behind "Fairytale of New York") in The Nation's Favourite Christmas Song.

Music video
The video shows the band dressed up in a winter-themed studio and then joined by a group of children who play instruments and join in with the singing.

Re-releases
As it was kept from number one by Slade's "Merry Xmas Everybody" it was decided to re-release the single in 1981. It was then found that the original tapes had been lost, so the song was re-recorded by the band and a new choir, from Kempsey Primary School in Worcester, was used (they had appeared on Roy Wood's solo single "Green Glass Windows" earlier that year). The single reached number 41 on the UK Singles Chart, and was released again in 1984, this time with an additional extended 12-inch version, getting as far as number 23.

As downloads became eligible for the weekly Top 75 from January 2007 onwards, and with exposure thanks to an Argos television advertisement, the song charted again in November and December 2007, this time reaching number 16. In the week of 13 December 2008, the song peaked at number 31. In the week of 14 December 2009, it peaked at number 45. In the week of 11 December 2010, it peaked at number 46. In the week of 12 December 2011, it peaked at number 28. It has appeared in the British top 40 every Christmas since and in the top 25 every Christmas since 2017.

Other versions by Roy Wood
In 1995, Wood recorded a live version and released it as a single on his own independent record label Woody Recordings. The only release from a shelved live album entitled Alive, the single, credited to the Roy Wood Big Band charted at number 59 on the UK Singles Chart.

In 2000, Wood re-recorded the song again for Mike Batt's Dramatico Records, as part of a medley with Batt's song "Wombling Merry Christmas". This novelty record was released as "I Wish It Could Be a Wombling Christmas Everyday" by the Wombles with Roy Wood and reached number 22 on the UK Singles Chart.

On 16 December 2020, Wood appeared with his band on Dave's Meet the Richardsons at Christmas, singing "I Wish It Could Be Christmas Everyday" in Jon Richardson and Lucy Beaumont's garden. This version, which also played out over the end credits, was credited to the Roy Wood Rock & Roll Band.

Charts

 A Vocal backing by the Suedettes
 B Vocal backing by the Suedettes and the Bleach Boys
 C Wizzard featuring vocal backing by the Suedettes plus the Stockland Green Bilateral School First Year Choir with additional noises by Miss Snob and Class 3C
 D Credited to Roy Wood's Wizzard
 E This is the new version with children from Kempsey Primary School, but released on Harvest Records the same catalogue number as the original. 
 F Credited by the Official Charts Company as Roy Wood and Wizzard
 G Re-entry of re-issue with 12" re-recording
 H In the digital era of downloads and streaming, the record is credited simply to Wizzard, with the rights holder being EMI Records.

Certifications and sales

The Big Reunion version

Background and release
On 23 October 2013, it was announced that the six 1990s and early 2000s pop bands who reunited for the ITV2 series The Big Reunion - Five, 911, Atomic Kitten, B*Witched, Blue, Honeyz and Liberty X - would be releasing a cover version of "I Wish It Could Be Christmas Everyday", with all proceeds split between six Text Santa charities: Age UK, Barnardo's, BeatBullying, the British Heart Foundation, CLIC Sargent and Help the Hospices. The recording of the charity single, which was produced by Danish producer and songwriter Cutfather (the Saturdays and One Direction), was the subject of a behind-the-scenes documentary broadcast on ITV2 on 12 December 2013. The song was released on 16 December 2013 and charted for 1 week in the UK Top 75 at Number 21, with the release credited to The Big Reunion Cast 2013.

Music video
The official music video for the Big Reunion version of the song was uploaded to YouTube on 2 December 2013.

Charts

Other cover versions
 All Star United in 1999, released on the BEC Records holiday compilation album Happy Christmas Vol. 2.
 A-Teens in 2001, as the B-side to their single "Heartbreak Lullaby", and later added to the Radio Disney Holiday Jams 2 compilation album in 2002.
 Tweenies in 2001, on their holiday album The Christmas Album.
 Girls Aloud in 2005, on the special edition of their album Chemistry.
 Sarah Brightman in 2008, on her holiday album A Winter Symphony.
 Wilson Phillips in 2010, on their holiday album Christmas in Harmony (peaked at No. 14 on the Billboard Adult Contemporary chart). The official music video was uploaded to YouTube on 4 November 2010.
 Leona Lewis in 2013, on her holiday album Christmas, with Love.
 Olly Murs in 2012, originally performed live for the BBC, and made commercially available on a 2013 Special Edition reissue of his album Right Place Right Time.
 Nick Lowe in 2013, on his holiday album Quality Street: A Seasonal Selection for All the Family and its live 2015 follow-up album The Quality Holiday Revue Live.
 Kylie Minogue in 2016, on her 2016 album Kylie Christmas: Snow Queen Edition, an expanded reissue of her 2015 album Kylie Christmas.
 Cheap Trick in 2017, on their holiday album Christmas Christmas, and with Roy Wood on lead vocals on a live recording released in 2018 for Record Store Day.

References

1973 songs
1973 singles
Wizzard songs
British Christmas songs
Harvest Records singles
Warner Records singles
Song recordings produced by Roy Wood
Song recordings produced by Xenomania
Song recordings with Wall of Sound arrangements
Songs written by Roy Wood
2013 singles
Universal Music Group singles